Hill Road may refer to:

 Hill Road, Hong Kong, a road in Shek Tong Tsui, Hong Kong Island, Hong Kong
 Hill Road, Mumbai, an arterial road in Bandra (West), Mumbai, India

See also
 Hills Road